Association Sportive Capoise (commonly referred to as AS Capoise or simply ASC) is a professional football club based in Cap-Haïtien, Haiti.

Honours
Ligue Haïtienne: 3
 1997, 2017 C, 2018 O
Coupe d'Haïti: 3
 1938, 2009, 2011

International competitions
CONCACAF Champions League: 2 appearances
1991 – Second Round (Caribbean) – Lost against  L'Etoile de Morne-à-l'Eau 4 – 1 on aggregate (stage 2 of 7)
1995 – Second Round (Caribbean) – Withdrew

Crests

Current squad

References

Football clubs in Haiti
Association football clubs established in 1930
Nord (Haitian department)
1930s establishments in Haiti